Ace of Diamond is an anime series based on the manga by Yuji Terajima serialized in Weekly Shōnen Magazine. The second season started airing soon after on April 6, 2015 on TX Network stations and later on AT-X. Like its predecessor, the episodes were simulcast in the aforementioned countries by Crunchyroll with English and German subtitles.

Six pieces of theme musics are used for the episodes: two opening and four ending themes. From episodes 76–88, the opening theme is "HEROES" by GLAY, while the ending themes are "KIMERO!!" by OxT and "BLUE WINDING ROAD" by Ryōta Ōsaka, Nobunaga Shimazaki, Natsuki Hanae, Shouta Aoi and Yoshitsugu Matsuoka.



Episode list

References

Ace of Diamond episode lists
2015 Japanese television seasons
2016 Japanese television seasons